Ctenotus is a genus of skinks (family Scincidae). The genus belongs to a clade in the Sphenomorphus group which contains such genera as Anomalopus and the close relatives Eulamprus and Gnypetoscincus.

Lizards in the genus Ctenotus are commonly called comb-eared skinks, a reference to the scales aligned near the ear. Ctenotus lizards are able to move very quickly, disappearing whilst being observed. They are highly active in their habits, foraging amongst a diverse range of habitat.

The members of the genus Ctenotus are widely distributed, in all states of Australia, and are especially diverse in arid regions and the tropical north, accounting for 10–20% of the lizard species. Around a quarter of lizards found in one area of the Great Sandy Desert are Ctenotus skinks, 11 of the 40 species. A single dune may have up to six species of Ctenotus. The Southwest Australian region contains 23 species. The size ranges from very small to moderately large, being similarly varied in body types from slender to stout. The diversity of forms allows species to occupy different niches, often in the same locality.

Species
Ctenotus is the most diverse reptile genus in Australia, with approximately 100 member species. Identification to the rank of species is regarded as difficult, and the largest lizard genus is also one of the most poorly understood.

Ctenotus agrestis  – Mitchell grass ctenotus
Ctenotus alacer  – lively ctenotus
Ctenotus alleni  – Ajana ctenotus
Ctenotus allotropis  – brown-blazed wedgesnout ctenotus
Ctenotus angusticeps  – northwestern coastal ctenotus, little leopard ctenotus, Airlie Island ctenuous
Ctenotus aphrodite  – Oorida ctenotus
Ctenotus arcanus  – arcane ctenotus
Ctenotus ariadnae  – Ariadna's ctenotus
Ctenotus arnhemensis  – Jabiluka ctenotus
Ctenotus astarte  – stony downs ctenotus
Ctenotus astictus  – Arnhem striped ctenotus
Ctenotus atlas  – southern mallee ctenotus
Ctenotus australis  – western limestone ctenotus
Ctenotus borealis  – white-faced ctenotus
Ctenotus brachyonyx  – short-clawed ctenotus
Ctenotus brevipes  – short-footed ctenotus
Ctenotus brooksi  – wedgesnout ctenotus
Ctenotus burbidgei  – plain-backed Kimberley ctenotus
Ctenotus calurus  – blue-tailed finesnout ctenotus
Ctenotus capricorni  – Capricorn ctenotus
Ctenotus catenifer  – chain-striped south-west ctenotus
Ctenotus coggeri  – brown-backed ctenotus
Ctenotus colletti  – Collett’s skink, buff-tailed finesnout ctenotus
Ctenotus decaneurus  – ten-lined ctenotus
Ctenotus delli  – Darling Range south-west ctenotus 
Ctenotus duricola  – Eastern Pilbara lined ctenotus, Pilbara ctenotus
Ctenotus dux  – fine side-lined ctenotus
Ctenotus ehmanni  – brown-tailed finesnout ctenotus 
Ctenotus essingtonii  – lowlands plain-backed ctenotus
Ctenotus euclae  – wedgesnout ctenotus
Ctenotus eurydice  – brown-backed yellow-lined ctenotus 
Ctenotus eutaenius  – black-backed yellow-lined ctenotus
Ctenotus fallens  – West-coast laterite ctenotus
Ctenotus gagudju  – Magela ctenotus, Kakadu ctenotus
Ctenotus gemmula  – jewelled south-west ctenotus
Ctenotus grandis  – grand ctenotus
Ctenotus greeri  – spotted-necked ctenotus
Ctenotus halysis  – chained ctenotus
Ctenotus hanloni  – nimble ctenotus
Ctenotus hebetior  – stout ctenotus
Ctenotus helenae  – clay-soil ctenotus
Ctenotus hilli  – top-end lowlands ctenotus 
Ctenotus iapetus  – North West Cape ctenotus
Ctenotus impar  – odd-striped ctenotus
Ctenotus ingrami  – unspotted yellow-sided ctenotus
Ctenotus inornatus  – bar-shouldered ctenotus
Ctenotus joanae  – black-soil ctenotus
Ctenotus kurnbudj  – Kurnbudj ctenotus
Ctenotus kutjupa 
Ctenotus labillardieri  – common south-west ctenotus
Ctenotus lancelini  – Lancelin Island skink, Lancelin south-west ctenotus
Ctenotus lateralis  – gravelly-soil ctenotus
Ctenotus leae  – orange-tailed finesnout skink
Ctenotus leonhardii  – Leonhardi's ctenotus, Leonhardi's skink, common desert ctenotus
Ctenotus maryani  – Maryan's ctenotus

Ctenotus mastigura  – whiptail ctenotus
Ctenotus mesotes  – median-striped ctenotus
Ctenotus militaris  – soldier ctenotus
Ctenotus mimetes  – checker-sided ctenotus
Ctenotus monticola  – Atherton ctenotus
Ctenotus nasutus  – nasute finesnout ctenotus
Ctenotus nigrilineatus  – pin-striped finesnout ctenotus 
Ctenotus nullum  – nullum ctenotus
Ctenotus olympicus  – spotted ctenotus
Ctenotus ora  – coastal plains skink
Ctenotus orientalis  – oriental ctenotus
Ctenotus pallasotus  – Western Pilbara lined ctenotus 
Ctenotus pallescens  – north-western wedgesnout ctenotus
Ctenotus pantherinus  - leopard ctenotus
Ctenotus piankai  - course sand ctenotus 
Ctenotus pulchellus  - red-sided ctenotus 
Ctenotus quattuordecimlineatus  - fourteen-lined ctenotus 
Ctenotus quinkan  - Quinkan ctenotus
Ctenotus quirinus  - Arnhem land ctenotus
Ctenotus rawlinsoni  - Cape Heath ctenotus
Ctenotus regius  - pale-rumped ctenotus
Ctenotus rhabdotus  - Kimberley lined ctenotus
Ctenotus rimacolus  - crack-dwelling ctenotus 
Ctenotus robustus  - robust ctenotus, striped skink
Ctenotus rosarium  - beaded ctenotus
Ctenotus rubicundus  - ruddy ctenotus
Ctenotus rufescens  - rufous finesnout ctenotus
Ctenotus rutilans  - rusty-shouldered ctenotus
Ctenotus saxatilis  - stony-soil ctenotus
Ctenotus schevilli  - black-soil rises ctenotus
Ctenotus schomburgkii  - barred wedge-snout ctenotus
Ctenotus septenarius  - massive-gibber ctenotus
Ctenotus serotinus  - gravel-downs ctenotus
Ctenotus serventyi  - north-western sandy-loam ctenotus
Ctenotus severus  - stern ctenotus
Ctenotus spaldingi  - straight-browed ctenotus
Ctenotus storri  - buff-striped ctenotus
Ctenotus strauchii  - eastern barred wedge-snout ctenotus
Ctenotus striaticeps  - stripe-headed finesnout ctenotus
Ctenotus stuarti  - Stuart's ctenotus
Ctenotus superciliaris  - sharp-browed ctenotus
Ctenotus taeniatus  - eyrean ctenotus 
Ctenotus taeniolatus  – copper-tailed skink, copper-tailed ctenotus
Ctenotus tanamiensis  – Tanami ctenotus
Ctenotus tantillus  – Kimberley wedge-snout ctenotus 
Ctenotus terrareginae  – Hinchinbrook ctenotus
Ctenotus uber  – spotted ctenotus
Ctenotus vagus  – uneven-striped ctenotus
Ctenotus vertebralis  – scant-striped ctenotus
Ctenotus xenopleura  – wide-striped ctenotus
Ctenotus youngsoni  – Shark Bay south-west ctenotus
Ctenotus zastictus  – Hamelin ctenotus, Hamelin Pool ctenotus
Ctenotus zebrilla  – Southern Cape York fine-snout ctenotus

Nota bene: A binomial authority in parentheses indicates that the species was originally described in a genus other than Ctenotus.

References

Further reading
Storr GM (1964). "Ctenotus, a New Generic Name for a Group of Australian Skinks". Western Australian Naturalist 9 (4): 84-85.

 
Lizard genera
Skinks of Australia
Taxa named by Glen Milton Storr